Kitessa is a village located in Haut-Mbomou Prefecture, Central African Republic. In 1995, the village had a population of about 300 people.

History 
On 29 April 2010, LRA bands attacked Kitessa and killed eight people.

On 18 August 2017, an alleged Peuhl militia raided Kitessa.

In 2020, Kitessa was under the control of UPC and erected a checkpoint in it.

Facilities
Kitessa has one health post and a primary school.

References 

Populated places in Haut-Mbomou